Richard Gordon Emmett (born July 10, 1953) is a vocalist, guitarist, and member of the Canadian rock band Triumph.

Career
In Toronto, during the mid 1970s, several local musicians formed a progressive rock group called Act III. One member of the group was Emmett, who left to join Triumph. This led to the break up of Act III. Other members formed Zon. Emmett says that one of the songs he performed with Act III was "The Blinding Light Show", a tune which he later recorded with Triumph. 

Emmett left Triumph in 1988 to pursue a solo career. His first solo album, Absolutely, was released in 1990 and became a moderate hit across the United States and Canada thanks to the hits "When a Heart Breaks," "Big Lie" and "Saved by Love". He is also a writer for Guitar Player magazine and teaches song-writing and music business at Humber College in Toronto. For a time during the 1980s, Emmett contributed cartoons to Hit Parader magazine satirizing the music industry.
 
Due to a production error by Gil Moore and Mike Levine on Triumph's first album, Emmett changed the spelling of his first name to "Rik" rather than have the album recalled or cause confusion with fans.

Although he is best known as a rock guitarist, his playing style incorporates rock, blues, jazz, classical, bluegrass, and flamenco techniques. Similarly, his songwriting and discography demonstrate his ability to employ and blend multiple genres. In April 2005, he won the Canadian Smooth Jazz Award for Guitarist of the Year.

Emmett is also a proficient singer, splitting lead vocal duties of Triumph with Gil Moore. However, most of the songs garnering radio play were those of Emmett as he tended to write and sing in a more commercial style, while Moore's song-writing and singing were in more of a heavy metal style. Emmett's voice also has a noticeable resemblance to Geddy Lee (of Rush),{} leading to the band's sound itself often being compared to Rush.

In 2007, Emmett joined former Triumph bandmates Gil Moore and Mike Levine for their induction into the Canadian Music Industry Hall of Fame. On Sunday April 6, 2008 at The 2008 JUNO Awards, Triumph was inducted into the Canadian Music Hall of Fame by the Canadian Academy of Recording Arts and Sciences (CARAS).

As a result of positive audience response to their dual guitar work in live shows, Emmett and guitarist Dave Dunlop formed the duo Strung-Out Troubadours. In 2007, they won 'Album of the Year' and 'Group/Duo of the Year' at the Canadian Smooth Jazz Awards, where they were the most heavily nominated act. Both were also nominated for 'Best Guitarist'.

Emmett's 2018 tour with Dunlop may prove to be his last, citing an interest in retirement, or at least an extended break.

As of January 2019, Emmett is on hiatus from touring.

Discography

Solo albums
 Absolutely (1990)
 Ipso Facto (1992)
 The Spiral Notebook (1995)
 Ten Invitations from the Mistress of Mr. E. (1997)
 Swing Shift (1997)
 Raw Quartet (1999)
 Handiwork (2002)
 Good Faith (2003)
 Then Again: Acoustic Selections from the Triumph Catalogue (2012)
 Marco's Secret Songbook (2012)

Live albums
 Rik Emmett LIVE at Berklee (2000)
 ‘’Live at Hugh’s Room’’ (2007)

DVDs
 One Night in Cinci (2005)
 Live at 10 Gigs (2005)

with Triumph
 Triumph (1976)
 Rock & Roll Machine (1977)
 Just a Game (1979)
 Progressions of Power (1980)
 Allied Forces (1981)
 Never Surrender (1982)
 Thunder Seven (1984)
 The Sport of Kings (1986)
 Surveillance (1987)

with Sam Reid
 The Spirit of Christmas (1999)

with Strung-Out Troubadours
 Strung-Out Troubadours (2006)
 Push & Pull (2009)
 reCOVERy room 9 (2011)

with Airtime
 Liberty Manifesto (2007)

with Pavlo and Oscar Lopez
 Trifecta (2009)

with RESolution9
 RES9 (2016)

Solo singles

Soundtrack appearances
 "Saved by Love" (from Problem Child 2) (1991)

See also
Pavlo
Oscar Lopez

References

External links

 Official Rik Emmett Website
 CanConRox bio

1953 births
Living people
Canadian rock guitarists
Canadian male guitarists
Canadian songwriters
Canadian rock singers
Canadian male singers
Canadian heavy metal guitarists
Canadian rock keyboardists
Lead guitarists
Musicians from Toronto
Triumph (band)
Writers from Toronto